Shoulder bag may refer to:
 Handbag, a bag typically used by women to hold personal items
 Messenger bag, a bag worn over one shoulder with a strap that winds around the chest
 A single strap satchel